Luke Davids (born 17 July 2001) is a South African sprinter. He won the gold medal in the 100 metres event at the 2018 Summer Youth Olympics held in Buenos Aires, Argentina.

In 2018, he won the gold medal in the 100 metres event at the 2018 African Youth Games in Algiers, Algeria. He also won the silver medal in the 200 metres event. At the 2019 African U18 and U20 Championships in Athletics held in Abidjan, Ivory Coast, he won the bronze medal in the 100 metres event and the silver medal in the 200 metres event.

References

External links 
 

Living people
2001 births
Place of birth missing (living people)
South African male sprinters
Athletes (track and field) at the 2018 Summer Youth Olympics
Athletes (track and field) at the 2018 African Youth Games
Youth Olympic gold medalists for South Africa
Youth Olympic gold medalists in athletics (track and field)